This is a list of compositions by the Austrian composer Wilhelm Kienzl (1857–1941).

Operas

Melodramas
 Die Brautfahrt (The Bridal Voyage) op. 9
 2 Melodramas op. 97
 Die Jungfrau und die Nonne (The Virgin and the Nun) op. 98
 Eine Marienballade von François Villon (A Maria-Ballad by François Villon) op. 119

Orchestral works
 Abendstimmungen (Evening Moods) for string orchestra and harp (originally for piano four hands) op. 53
 Symphonic Variations on the Straßburg-Song from the opera Der Kuhreigen op. 109a (Piano Version: op. 109b)

Choral works

 2 Songs op. 14
 3 Pieces for Male Choir op. 17
 3 Songs for Female Choir op. 19
 5 Tanzweisen for Female Choir op. 21b
 Landsknechtlied (Mercenary's Song) for Male Choir and Orchestra op. 23
 Zur Trauung (To Marriage) op. 26
 3 Songs for Male Choir op. 36
 3 Pieces for Male Choir op. 54
 5 Songs for Female Choir op. 58
 6 Popular Songs op. 59
 6 Popular Male Choruses op. 60
 5 Songs for Female Voices and Harp or Piano op. 63
 Wach' auf, mein Volk! (Wake Up, My People!) for Male Choir and Orchestra op. 64
 Das Volkslied (The Folk-Song) for Male Choir op. 65
 Fasching (Mardi Gras) for Tenor, Baritone, Bass, Male Choir and Orchestra op. 67
 4 Songs for Male Choir op. 68
 6 Songs for Male Choir op. 72
 8 Songs for Female Choir op. 76
 3 Pieces for Male Choir op. 78
 2 Geschichtsbilder (Story-Pictures) for Male Choir and Orchestra op. 79
 Deutsche Ritterlieder (German Knights' Songs) for Male Choir and Orchestra op. 86
 Das Lied vom Kaiser Arnulf (Emperor Arnulf's Song) for Male Choir and Orchestra op. 88
 3 Pieces for Male Choir op. 89
 Im Schlachtendonner (In the Din of Battle) for Male Choir op. 92
 Ostara for Male Choir and Orchestra op. 93
 Deutsch-Österreich (German Austria), national anthem op. 101 (1918)
 5 Pieces for Male Choir op. 103
 Arbeiterlied (Workers' Song) for Male Choir op. 104
 4 Songs for Male Choir op. 105
 2 Pieces for Male Choir op. 107
 5 Songs for Male Choir op. 112
 Spar-Hymne (Saving Hymn) for Mixed Choir and Orchestra op. 115
 Chor der Toten (Choir of the Dead) for Mixed Choir and Orchestra op. 118

Chamber music
 3 Fantasy-Pieces for Violin and Piano op. 7
 Piano Trio in F minor op. 13
 String Quartet No. 1 in B minor op. 22
 String Quartet No. 2 in C minor op. 99
 String Quartet No. 3 in E-flat major op. 113
 Waldstimmungen (Wood Moods) for four horns, op. 108

Piano works
 Skizzen op. 3 (Sketches)
 Kahnszene op. 5 (Boat Scenes)
 Bunte Tänze op. 10 (Colourful Dances)
 Aus alten Märchen op. 12 (From Old Fairy Tales)
 Aus meinem Tagebuch op. 15 (From My Diary)
 30 Tanzweisen op. 21 (1881)
 Scherzo in A minor op. 29
 Kinderliebe und –leben op. 30 (Children's Love and Life)
 Romantische Blätter op. 34 (Romantic Leaves/Sheets)
 Tanzbilder op. 41 (Dance Pictures)
 Daheim! op. 43 (Home!)
 Dichterreise op. 46 (Poet's Journey)
 Carneval op. 51
 Bilder aus dem Volksleben op. 52 (Pictures from the Folk-Life)
 Neue Klavierstücke op. 62 (New Piano Pieces)
 O schöne Jugendtage! op. 80 (O Beautiful Days of Youth)
 20 Pieces in Barn-Dance Form op. 95

Songs

 2 Songs op. 1
 4 Songs op. 2
 2 Poems (A. Grün) op. 4
 9 Songs in "folk-tone" op. 6
 8 Love-Songs op. 8 (1877)
 Liebesfrühling (Spring of Love) — song cycle (Friedrich Rückert) op. 11
 Süßes Verzichten (Sweet Abandonment) — song cycle op. 16
 Geliebt-Vergessen (Loved and Forgotten) — song cycle op. 18
 3 Album-sheets op. 24
 3 Songs op. 25
 Abschied (Farewell) op. 27
 Kuriose Geschichte (Curious Stories) op. 28
 3 Folk-Songs op. 31
 3 Songs op. 32
 Frühlingslieder (Spring Songs) op. 33
 2 Lieder aus Osten (Songs from the East) op. 35
 2 Songs each op. 37, op. 38, op. 39, op. 42
 4 Songs op. 44 (1894)
 4 japanische Lieder (Japanese Songs) op. 47
 Bonapartes Heimkehr (Bonaparte's Return) op. 48 (1896)
 Waldmeister (Forest Master)op. 49
 6 Songs op. 55

 Verwelkte Rosen (Wilted Roses) op. 56
 4 Popular Songs op. 57
 4 Songs op. 61
 Pamphilische Hirtenlieder (Pamphilic Herdsmen's Songs) 3 Songs, op. 66
 3 Songs op. 69a
 Moderne Lyrik (Modern Lyric) op. 71
 Aus Onkels Liedermappe (From Uncle's Song-Case) op. 73 (1906)
 Weihnacht (Christmas) op. 74
 5 Songs op. 81
 5 Songs op. 82
 Ein Weihnachtslied (A Christmas Song) op. 83
 3 Duets op. 84
 Nachsommerblüten (Late Summer Blossoms) op. 87
 Das Lied vom Weltkrieg (The Song from the World War) op. 91
 7 Songs op. 94
 Aus des Volkes Wunderhorn (From the Wondrous Horn of the People) op. 96 (1919)
 7 Songs op. 106 (1926)
 6 Lieder vom Glück (Songs of Happiness) op. 111
 6 Songs op. 114 (1930)
 7 Songs op. 120
 3 Songs op. 121
 4 Songs op. 123

References
Much of the content of this article comes from the equivalent German-language Wikipedia article (retrieved September, 2007).
Operone page on Kienzl, Retrieved 12 June 2009

 
Kienzl